Bobo Fing or Black Bobo may refer to:
Bobo Fing people
Bobo Fing language